Sierra Vista High School (SVHS) is a four-year comprehensive high school located in Baldwin Park, California. It opened in 1961 and is part of the Baldwin Park Unified School District. It is one of three high schools in the city, Baldwin Park High School and North Park Continuation School being the other two. Feeder schools include Sierra Vista Junior High School (7–8), Olive Middle School (6–8), and Jones Junior High (7–8) and Santa Fe (3–8). The school colors are Red and Black. The school mascot is a Don. The Dons are part of the Montview League for most sports. The top sports are Wrestling, Baseball,  Boys' and Girls' soccer, Boys' and Girls' Track & Field, and Football . Students can join over 50 academic and social clubs.

School Mission: SVHS provides a 21st-century education that emphasizes critical thinking, communication, and respect for diversity, in a safe and positive environment, supported by collaborative community involvement, in order to create successful, college-prepared and career ready citizens.

In the 2012-2013 school year, a new three-story building was completed and opened for classes to be held.

In late 2017, H. Vincent Pratt became the interim principal.

Electives
 Int/Adv Piano
 Symphonic Band
 Jazz Ensemble 
 Wind Ensemble 
 Concert Orchestra 
 Concert Choir
 Vocal Ensemble 
 Art I, II, III
 Commercial Art I, II, III
 Photography I, II
 Ceramics 
 Sculpture 
 Digital Art/ Video
 Technology
 Video/ Web design 
Javascript web/game design
 Avid Senior Seminar 
 Architectural Design
 Department aide

AP Classes Offered
 AP Art History
 AP Calculus AB/BC
 AP Biology 
AP Computer Science Principles
 AP Drawing 
 AP English Language and Composition
 AP English Literature and Composition
 AP Physics 
 AP Psychology
 AP Spanish Language
 AP Spanish Literature
 AP Studio Art 2D/ AP Studio Art 3D
 AP U.S. Government and Politics
 AP U.S. History
 AP Chemistry
 AP World History
 AP Environmental Science

Language Classes
 Spanish I, II, III
 Native Spanish II, III  
 AP Spanish Language 
 AP Spanish Literature 
 Mandarin I, II

Notable alumni
 Keith Closs- Former NBA player, Los Angeles Clippers.
 Carlos Ochoa- former Mexican National Soccer Team player.

References

External links
 

High schools in Los Angeles County, California
Public high schools in California
1961 establishments in California